Cocculinidae is a family of sea snails, deep-sea limpets, marine gastropod mollusks in the superfamily Cocculinoidea.

Genera
Genera within the family Cocculinidae include:
Genus Coccocrater Haszprunar, 1987
 Coccocrater pocillum
 Coccocrater portoricensis (Dall & Simpson, 1901)
Genus Coccopigya Marshall, 1986
 Coccopigya barbatula
 Coccopigya crebriflamina
 Coccopigya crebrilamina
 Coccopigya crinita
 Coccopigya hispida
 Coccopigya lata (Warén, 1996)
 Coccopigya mikkelsenae
 Coccopigya oculifera
 Coccopigya okutanii
 Coccopigya punctoradiata (Kuroda & Habe, 1949)
 Coccopigya spinigera (Jeffreys, 1883)
 Coccopigya viminensis (Rocchini, 1990)
Genus Cocculina Dall, 1882
 Cocculina adunca
 Cocculina alveolata
 Cocculina angulata
 Cocculina cingulina
 Cocculina emsoni McLean & Harasewych, 1995
 Cocculina fenestrata Ardila & Harasewych, 2005
 Cocculina japonica
 Cocculina leptalea A. E. Verrill, 1884
 Cocculina leptoglypta Dautzenberg & H. Fischer, 1897
 Cocculina mamilla
 Cocculina messingi McLean & Harasewych, 1995
 Cocculina oblonga
 Cocculina ovata
 Cocculina pacifica
 Cocculina rathbuni
 Cocculina striata
 Cocculina subcompressa
 Cocculina subquadrata
 Cocculina surugaensis
 Cocculina tenuitesta
 Cocculina tosaensis
Genus Fedikovella Moskalev, 1976
 Fedikovella beanii (Dall, 1882)
 Fedikovella caymanensis
Genus Macleaniella Leal & Harasewych 1999
 Macleaniella moskalevi Leal & Harasewych, 1999
Genus Paracocculina Haszprunar, 1987
 Paracocculina cervae
 Paracocculina laevis
 Teuthirostria Moskalev, 1976

References

 Marshall B. A. (1986). Recent and Tertiary Cocculinidae and Pseudococculinidae (Mollusca: Gastropoda) from New Zealand and New South Wales. New Zealand Journal of Zoology 12: 505-546

External links
 Dall W.H. (1882). On certain limpets and chitons from the deep waters off the eastern coast of the United States. Proceedings of the United States National Museum. 4: 400-414
 McLean J.H. & Harasewych M.G. (1995). Review of Western Atlantic species of Cocculinid and Pseudococculinid limpets, with descriptions of new species (Gastropoda: Cocculiniformia). Natural History Museum of Los Angeles County Contributions in Science, 453: 1-33

 
Gastropod families
Taxa named by William Healey Dall